Baghabar (also Romanized as Bāghābar) is a village in Lalehzar Rural District, Lalehzar District, Bardsir County, Kerman Province, Iran. At the 2006 census, its population was 1,791, in 399 families.

References 

Populated places in Bardsir County